This is a list of year-end number-one singles for New Zealand. Recorded Music NZ publishes the country's official weekly record charts. L.A.B's "In the Air" has spent the most time on the music charts out of any of the other Year end No.1 singles. It has spent 150 weeks on the charts, still counting.

Number-one singles

Key
 – Song of New Zealand origin

Notes

References

Year end